This is a list of English-language names given by World War I troops to places affected by World War I. Indeed, because there were many tensions during World War 1, some places had to be renamed. Since there was a very anti-German sentiment during World War 1, the military and government would rename towns, like Kitchener, Ontario in Canada, which was named Berlin until WWI. Another reason why English-language names were given by troops to places affected by WW1 is that English-speaking troops often fought in unknown territory and had difficulty pronouncing foreign placenames. Thus, with the advent of strategising and the creation of trench maps, the English-speaking troops (mostly belonging to the British Empire, and Americans starting in 1917) had to find a way to locate places and themselves.

In France and Belgium
 Berloo, Baloo: Bailleul
 Bosheep: Boeschepe
 Caterpillar Valley: a valley near Albert, Somme 
 Caterpillar Wood: a wood in Caterpillar Valley
 Dirty Bucket Corner: northwest of Ypres
 Eat Apples: Étaples
 Fitzclarence Farm: east of Ypres
 Funky Villages: Foncquevillers
 Gerty Wears Velvet: Goedesversvelde
 God: Goedesversvelde
 Monty Bong: Montauban-de-Picardie
 Moo-cow: Mouquet Farm, near Pozières
 Mucky Farm: Mouquet Farm, near Pozières
 Ocean Villas: Auchonvillers, Somme
 Plugstreet: Ploegsteert, Belgium
 Polygon Wood, Zonnebeke: from French Bois du Polygone
 Pop: Poperinghe
 White Sheet: Wytschaete
 Wipers: Ypres

Army map of an area of the Western Front, showing several such Army renamings

External links
http://westfrontassoc.mtcdevserver.com/the-great-war/great-war-on-land/britain-allies/383-gaz-tommy.html#sthash.b5FzWmoQ.dpbs

References

European theatre of World War I
Alternative place names